is a passenger railway station located in the town of Moroyama, Saitama, Japan, operated by East Japan Railway Company (JR East).

Lines

Station layout
The station consists of two opposed side platforms serving two tracks, which form a passing loop on the single-track line. The station building is located on the west (northbound) side. The platforms are connected by a footbridge. A storage siding is located behind the southbound platform 1. The station is staffed.

Platforms

History
The station opened on 15 April 1933. With the privatization of Japanese National Railways (JNR) on 1 April 1987, the station came under the control of JR East.

Passenger statistics
In fiscal 2019, the station was used by an average of 686 passengers daily (boarding passengers only). The passenger figures for previous years are as shown below.

Surrounding area
 Higashi-Moro Station (Tobu Ogose Line) (approximately 15 minutes' walk away)
 Saitama Medical School Moroyama Campus
 Moroyama Elementary School
 Moroyama Middle School
 Moroyama Town Hall
 Moroyama Post Office
 Moroyama Public Library

Bus services

Moro Station is served by the "Moro Bus" community minibus (Yuzu Yellow Line) service.

See also
 List of railway stations in Japan

References

External links

 Moro Station information (JR East) 

Railway stations in Saitama Prefecture
Hachikō Line
Stations of East Japan Railway Company
Railway stations in Japan opened in 1933
Moroyama, Saitama